Josef Fessler (1813–1872) was Roman Catholic Bishop of Sankt Pölten in Austria, a secretary of the First Vatican Council and an authority on patristics.

Biography and works
Josef Fessler was born on 2 December 1813, at Lochau near Bregenz in the Vorarlberg. His parents were peasants. He early showed great abilities. His classical studies were done at Feldkirch, his philosophy at Innsbruck including a year of legal studies, and his theology at Brixen. He was ordained priest in 1837. After a year as master in a school at Innsbruck, he studied for two more years in Vienna life, then became professor of ecclesiastical history and canon law in the theological school at Brixen, 1841-52. He published at the quest of the Episcopal Conference of Wurzburg, in 1848, a short book Über die Provincial-Concilien und Diöcesan-Synoden (Innsbruck, 1849), and in 1850-1 the well-known Institutiones Patrologiae quas ad frequentiorem utiliorem et faciliorem SS. Patrum lectionem promovendam concinnavit J. Fessler (Innsbruck, 2 Volumes in octavo). This work superseded the unfinished books of Johann Adam Möhler and Franz Michael Permaneder and was not surpassed by the subsequent works of Alzog and Joseph Nirschl. A later edition (Innsbruck, 1890-6) was made by Prof. Jungmann of Louvain.

From 1856 to 1861, Fessler was professor of canon law in the University of Vienna, after making special studies for six months at Rome. He was consecrated as assistant bishop to the bishop of Brixen, Dr. Gasser, on 31 March 1862, and became his vicar-general for the Vorarlberg. On 23 September 1864, he was named by the emperor Bishop of St. Polten, not far from Vienna. When at Rome in 1867, he was named assistant at the papal throne. In 1869 Pope Pius IX proposed Bishop Fessler to the Congregation for the direction of the coming Vatican Council as secretary to the council. The appointment was well received, the only objection being from Cardinal Caterini, who thought the choice of an Austrian might make the other nations jealous. Bishop Fessler was informed of his appointment on 27 March, and as the pope wished him to come with all speed to Rome, he arrived there on 8 July, after hastily dispatching the business of his diocese. He had a pro-secretary and two assistants. It was certainly wise to choose a prelate whose vast and intimate acquaintance with the Church Fathers and with ecclesiastical history was equalled only by his thorough knowledge of canon law. He seems to have given universal satisfaction by his work as secretary, but the burden was a heavy one, and in spite of his excellent constitution, his untiring labours were thought to have been the cause of his early death.
 
Before the council he published an opportune work "Das letzte und das nächste allgemeine Konsil" (Freiburg, 1869) and after the council he replied in a masterly brochure to the attack on the council by Dr. Schulte, professor of canon law and German law at Prague. Dr. Schulte's pamphlet on the power of the Roman popes over princes, countries, peoples and individuals, in the light of their acts since the reign of Gregory VII, was very similar in character to the Vaticanism pamphlet of Mr. Gladstone, and rested on just the same fundamental misunderstanding of the dogma of Papal Infallibility as defined by the Vatican Council. The Prussian Government promptly appointed Dr. Schute to a professorship at Bonn, while it imprisoned Catholic priests and bishops. Fessler's reply, "Die wahre und die falsche Unfehlbarkeit der Päpste" (Vienna, 1871), was translated into French by Cosquin, editor of "Le Français", and into English by Ambrose St. John (The True and False Infallibility of the Popes, London, 1875). It is an explanation of the doctrine of Infallibility as taught by the Italian "Ultramontane" theologians, such as Bellarmine in the sixteenth century, Pietro Ballerini in the eighteenth century and Giovanni Perrone in the nineteenth century. But it was difficult for those who had been fighting against the definition to realize that the Infallibilists "had wanted no more than this". Bishop Hefele of Rottenburg am Neckar, who had strongly opposed the definition and afterwards loyally accepted it, said he entirely agreed with the moderate view taken by Bishop Fessler, but doubted whether such views would be accepted as sound in Rome. It was clear, one would have thought, that the secretary of the council was likely to know; and the hesitations of the pious and learned Hefele were removed by the warm Brief of approbation which Pius IX addressed to the author.  He died on 25 April 1872.

Sources and references

Anton Erdinger, Dr. Joseph Fessler, Bischof v. St. Polten, ein Lebensbild (Brixen, 1874)
 Mitterrutzner in Kirchenlexikon
Theodor Granderath and Konrad Kirch, Geschichte des Vatiannischen Konzils (Freiburg im Breisgau, 2 volumes, 1903).

1813 births
1872 deaths
People from Bregenz District
19th-century Roman Catholic bishops in Austria-Hungary